The Asia/Oceania Zone was one of three zones of regional competition in the 1996 Fed Cup.

Group I
 Venue: 700 Years Anniversary Complex, Chiang Mai, Thailand (outdoor hard)
 Date: 21–24 February

The eight teams were divided into two pools of four teams. The top two teams of each pool play-off in a two-round knockout stage to decide which nation progresses to World Group II play-offs. Nations finishing in the bottom place in each pool were relegated to Asia/Oceania Zone Group II for 1997.

Pools

Knockout stage

  advanced to World Group II Play-offs.
  and  relegated to Group II in 1997.

Group II
 Venue: 700 Years Anniversary Complex, Chiang Mai, Thailand (outdoor hard)
 Date: 19–24 January

The seven teams were divided into two pools of three and four. The top two teams from each pool then moved on to the play-off stage of the competition. The two teams that won a match from the play-off stage would advance to Group I for 1997.

Pools

Play-offs

  and  advanced to Group I in 1997.

See also
Fed Cup structure

References

 Fed Cup Profile, South Korea
 Fed Cup Profile, India
 Fed Cup Profile, Hong Kong
 Fed Cup Profile, China
 Fed Cup Profile, Thailand
 Fed Cup Profile, Kazakhstan
 Fed Cup Profile, New Zealand
 Fed Cup Profile, Singapore
 Fed Cup Profile, Chinese Taipei
 Fed Cup Profile, Uzbekistan
 Fed Cup Profile, Pacific Oceania

External links
 Fed Cup website

 
Asia
1996 in Chiang Mai
Sport in Chiang Mai
Tennis tournaments in Thailand